Doti District, part of Sudurpashchim Province, is one of the 77 districts of Nepal.

History
Doti was a medieval kingdom of Kumaon.  It was founded by Niranjan Malla Dev, the last son of the Katyuri dynasty and younger brother of Abhay Pal of Askot.  Previously, the area between Ramganga in the west and the Karnali River in the east was under the control of the Raikas (rulers of the Doti kingdom, alternately Kumaun or Rainka Maharaj).

Ancient Doti was a part of Kumaon Kingdom, Now remaining Kumaon region is part of Uttrakhand a state in modern-day india, Nepal's neighboring country. Kingdom of Kumaon lost Doti during the expansion of Nepal Kingdom in 1790.  It was formed after the Katyuri Kingdom's disintegration during the 13th century.  Doti was one of eight different princely states formed after the disintegration, and all claim Katyuri heritage. The seven other known states are:
Baijnath-Katyuri
Dwarahat
Baramandal
Askot
Sira
Sora
Sui (Kali Kumaon)

The Katyuri Kingdom's dissolution is attributed to the invasion of Khas Kings Ashoka Challa and Krachalla, from the Karnali zone (Dullu) in 1191 and 1223 respectively.  Later, the whole land between Ramganga in the west (Uttarakhand) and the Karnali in the east (which divides the far western region from other parts of Nepal), came under the Raikas' rule — after the establishment of the Katyuri's dynastic Raikas Doti. Brahma Dev Mandi at Kanchanpur; a district within Mahakali, was established by Katyuri King Brahma Dev.

Raikas of Doti and their lineage
Historical evidence  of the following raikas has been discovered:
Niranjan Malla Dev (founder of Doti Kingdom beginning of the 13th century)
Nagi Malla (1238)
Ripu Malla (1279)
Nirai Pal (1353) may be from Askot as historical evidence from 1354 AD relating to him has been found in Almora.
Nag Malla (1384)
Dhir Malla (1400)
Ripu Malla (1410)
Anand Malla (1430)
Balinarayan Malla (1400)
Sansar Malla (1442)
Kalyan Malla (1443)
Suratan Malla (1478)
Kriti Malla (1482)
Prithivi Malla (1488)
Medini Jay Malla (1512)
Ashok Malla (1517)
Raj Malla (1539)
Arjun Malla/Shahi (1500 )
Bhupati Malla/Shahi (1558)
Sagaram Shahi (1567)
Hari Malla/Shahi (1581; last Raika of Sira, and the adjoining part of Nepal)
Rudra Shahi (1630)
Vikram Shahi (1642)
Mandhata Shahi (1671)
Raghunath Shahi (1690)
Hari Shahi (1720)
Krishna Shahi (1760)
Deep Shahi (1785)
Prithivi Pati Shahi (1790; He had fought against the Gorkha Ruler and also with the British in 1814 AD)

Conflict with Gorkha Kingdom
The historic place of war between the Doti Kingdom and Gorkha kingdom during the period of Expanding Kingdom of Nepal in 1790, is Nari-Dang which lies on the bank of the Seti River and Dumrakot was the base of the Doti Kingdom during the fighting against the Gorkhalis.

Doti was captured by Gorkha forces, and the Gorkha rulers went on to destroy several historical sites in Doti — attempting to cover its legendary bravery and tenacity.  The Dotyali people were also subject to ethnic prejudice, and were frequently excluded from government jobs and offices of state. Somehow in 1950, a few Dotyalis established their identities as national heroes based solely on their courage, daring, and contribution to their country. Noted among them are Martyr Dashrath Chand Ministry of Home Affairs, Martyr Bhim Dutta Pant Ministry of Home Affairs, and K.I. Singh, a revolutionary leader who later became prime minister.

Dotyali language.
Dotiyali is the local language spoken in the Doti region; the far western region of Nepal, which is similar to the Kumauni language, a language spoken by people of Kumaon, a state in modern-day india, Nepal's neighboring country.  According to Rahul Sankrityayan, Dotiyali is the dialect of the Kumauni language which was brought to Doti by a section of the Katyuri dynasty of Kumaun which had ruled over Doti until 1790. The Doti kingdom was formed after the Katyuri kingdom had broken up into eight different princely states of different sections of the Katyuris.  However, in Nepal it is considered as a Nepali dialect; though Local intellectuals and people of Doti, those who are speaking Dotiyali language that they are increasingly demanding their language to be recognized as one of the national language of Nepal.

Geography and climate

Demographics
At the time of the 2011 Nepal census, Doti District had a population of 211,746. Of these, 91.2% spoke Doteli, 6.8% Nepali, 1.0% Magar, 0.4% Kham, 0.1% Achhami, 0.1% Maithili, 0.1% Tharu and 0.2% other languages as their first language.

In terms of ethnicity/caste, 57.7% were Chhetri, 12.3% Kami, 7.9% Hill Brahmin, 4.6% Damai/Dholi, 3.5% other Dalit, 3.5% Thakuri, 3.4% Magar, 2.4% Sarki, 1.4% Badi, 1.1% Lohar, 0.5% Newar, 0.5% Sanyasi/Dasnami, 0.2% Kumal, 0.1% Gurung, 0.1% Majhi, 0.1% Musalman, 0.1% Tamang, 0.1% other Terai, 0.1% Tharu and 0.2% others.

In terms of religion, 99.0% were Hindu, 0.8% Buddhist, 0.1% Christian and 0.1% Muslim.

In terms of literacy, 55.2% could read and write, 3.4% could only read and 41.3% could neither read nor write.

Administration
The district consists of nine municipalities, out of which two are urban municipalities and seven are rural municipalities. These are as follows:
 Dipayal Silgadhi Municipality
 Shikhar Municipality
 Purbichauki Rural Municipality
 Badikedar Rural Municipality
 Jorayal Rural Municipality
 Sayal Rural Municipality
 Aadarsha Rural Municipality
 Dr. K. I. Singh Rural Municipality 
 Bogatan Rural Municipality

Former Village Development Committees 
Prior to the restructuring of the district, Doti District consisted of the following Village development committees:

 Banalek 
 Banja Kakani 
 Barchhen 
 Basudevi 
 Bhawardanda 
 Bhadhegaun
 Bhumirajmandau
 Changra
 Chhapali
 Chhatiwan
 Dahakalikasthan 
 Daud
 Dhanglagau 
 Dhirkamandau
 Durgamandau 
 Gadasera
 Gaguda
 Gaihragaun 
 Ganjari 
 Ghanteshwar 
 Girichauka 
 Jijodamandau 
 Kadamandau 
 Kalena 
 Kalikasthan 
 Kanachaur 
 Kapalleki 
 Kedar Akhada 
 Khatiwada 
 Khirsain 
 Ladagada 
 Lamikhal 
 Lana Kedareshwar 
 Latamandau 
 Lakshminagar 
 Mahadevsthan 
 Mannakapadi 
 Mudabhara 
 Mudhegaun 
 Nirauli 
 Pachanali 
 Pokhari 
 Ranagaun 
 Sanagaun
 Saraswatinagar 
 Satphari 
 Simchaur 
 Tijali
 Tikha 
 Tikhatar
 Toleni 
 Baglekh 
 Barpata

See also
Doti
Khaptad Lake

References

Sources

A New History of Uttarakhand by Y.S. Kathoach
Dotiyali language

 
Districts of Nepal established during Rana regime or before